Angular Recording Corporation was an independent record label founded in New Cross, South East London. It was established in June 2003 by two ex-Goldsmiths College students, Joe Daniel and Joe Margetts, who reclaimed a local Ordnance Survey Triangulation Station and made it their first artefact: ARC 001.

The label's founders were influenced by a love of angular pop music and the Manchester label Factory Records. Gaining funding through medical testing, Angular Recording Corporation was able to finance its debut release in November 2003, the NME-championed The New Cross : An Angular Sampler, making it the lead review in the magazine.

In the 2011 England riots, the label lost all its stock and entire back catalogue in the PIAS warehouse fire.

An Angular Store website remains active.

Discography

Samplers 

The first two Angular samplers launched the careers of a number of bands, including: Art Brut, Bloc Party and The Long Blondes.

ARC 002: The New Cross

Bloc Party - "The Marshals Are Dead" 
The Fairies Band - "Pink Socks Rock"
The Vichy Government - "Make Love to the Camera" 
Nemo - "Picadilly in Sepia"
The Violets - "Laxteen"
Luxembourg - "Making Progress"
The Swear - "High Rise"
Elizabeth Harper - "Don Juan"
Lovers of Today - "Guy Fawkes"
Art Brut - "Formed a Band"
Lady Fuzz - "What's it Worth?"
Gifthorse - "You Save my Life, I'll Ruin Yours"
The Bridge - "First Frenzy"
Mark Sampson - "The London Eye"

ARC 004: Rip Off Your Labels

The Vichy Government - "I Control Discourse"
The Violets - "Stealer"
Art Brut - "Top of the Pops"
The Fucks - "Argos"
The Long Blondes - "Autonomy Boy"
Showboys - "Factory"
The Swear - "Advert Boy"
The Boyfriends - "No Tomorrow"
Elizabeth Harper - "Trouble in the Palace"
Gifthorse - "Happy Daggers"
Lovers of Today - "A Short Nasty Shock"
Luxembourg - "Let Us Have It"
The Rocks - "We Got It (Galen Remix)"

References

External links

 Angular Store

British independent record labels
Record labels based in London
Record labels established in 2003
Alternative rock record labels
Media and communications in the London Borough of Lewisham
Companies based in the London Borough of Lewisham